Pakistani cricket may refer to one of the following:

Cricket in Pakistan
Pakistan national cricket team
Pakistan national women's cricket team
Pakistan Cricket Board